The Citizens for the Adelphi Theater is an advocacy group formed by Bill Morton in an attempt to save the historic theater in Chicago from demolition.

Adelphi Theater
The Adelphi Theater, a historical landmark in Rogers Park, was located at the intersection of Clark street and Estes avenue. In its prime, the Adelphi was one of thirteen in Chicago's Rogers Park neighborhood. Designed by John E.O. Pridmore, the Adelphi was an Art Deco-styled building, built in 1917 with a brick and terra-cotta edifice. It originally had seating in an auditorium slanted toward the screen for 1500 people. Famous Chicago artist, Ed Paschke was once a tenant in the second floor studio space.

Vacant
Bill Morton, owner of 4x Records, moved to Rogers Park so that he could continue to work on his business and, while looking for space for his business, came upon the vacant theater. He became infatuated with the building and its history and worked out a deal with its owners so that his band and company could use the space while upgrading its interior. The mounting struggles to keep the building standing soon became evident and Bill Morton started his first not for profit organization, Citizens for the Adelphi Theater. There was much support for Citizens for the Adelphi Theater to raise funds and renovate the beautiful, architecturally sound building.

Demolition
Alderman Joe Moore, however, agreed to the sale and demolition of the building so that condominiums could be built in its place. The owner of the construction company working on the project did not have financial stability, however, and his company went bankrupt just after the foundation for the condos was put in.

The community members of Rogers Park now call it "A hole of a Mess" when once it was a beautiful landmark with much promise.

See also
List of Chicago Landmarks

References

External links
 Chi-Town Daily News article about Bill Mortons attempt to save the Adelphi Theater
 Chicago Reader article about Bill Mortons attempt to save the Adelphi Theater

Organizations based in Chicago